Saiyid Khurd lived in Kheri, Uttar Pradesh, India in the 15th century, his tomb is present in the town. It is being said that Kheri derived its name from Saiyid Khurd.

References 

People from Lakhimpur Kheri district
Indian Muslims
1563 deaths
Year of birth unknown